The 2009–10 season was French football club Olympique Lyonnais's 51st season in Ligue 1 and was their 21st consecutive season in the top division of French football. For the first time in seven years, Lyon entered the football season without defending the Ligue 1 title. They were overthrown by Bordeaux who claimed the title on the final day of 2008–09 season. This was also the first time in nine years Lyon had to earn qualification to the group stage of the UEFA Champions League as they began from the playoff round, due to their third-place finish last season.

News
On 6 June 2009, it was announced by Lyon that fitness coach Robert Duverne had quit his position to focus full-time on the France national team, who were attempting to qualify for the 2010 World Cup. Vincent Espié, who had previously worked as fitness coach for Claude Puel's former club Lille, was brought in as his replacement.

Departures this summer include long time Lyonnais Juninho, who, after spending a respectable eight seasons at the club, moved to Qatari club Al-Gharafa. Defender Sandy Paillot joined fellow Ligue 1 club Grenoble for a fee of €2 million after spending almost a year-and-a-half on loan at the club. Also during this summer window, a host of youth players who were either deemed surplus to requirements or looking to find some significant playing time departed the club. Pierrick Valdivia, Ayan Si-Mohamed and Alexis Carra moved to Sedan, Stade Reims and Italian club Vicenza, respectively. Midfielder Romain Dedola and defender Morgan Ancian both joined Strasbourg, while Quentin Barlet and Jérémy Dequelson joined lesser rivals Lyon Duchère. Another youth player, Jérémy Pied, joined Metz on loan for the entire 2009–10 season with hopes that the player will receive greater playing time.

On 1 July 2009, Lyon surprisingly announced that they had reached an agreement with Spanish club Real Madrid for the transfer of Karim Benzema, who reportedly wanted to stay at least one more year with his hometown club. The transfer fee was priced at €35m with the fee rising to as much as €41m based on incentives. A day later, Lyon confirmed the departure of Ivorian winger Abdul Kader Keïta who, despite being Lyon's highest paid transfer at that time, failed to live up to expectations. Keïta moved to Turkish club Galatasaray, with Lyon earning €8.5 million for the player. On 5 August, the club announced the departure of striker Frédéric Piquionne, who joined English club Portsmouth on loan for the entire season. One week later, various sources in France reported that defender John Mensah would be joining English club Sunderland on loan for the season, with the club also having an option to purchase the player for a fee of €7 million following the season. The move was subject to Mensah passing a medical and being granted a work permit, which was completed a week-and-a-half later.

On 7 July, Lyon confirmed their first transfer arrival to the club. After almost two weeks of negotiations with Portuguese club Porto, Lyon reached an agreement on a transfer fee for the Argentine striker Lisandro López. The transfer fee was priced at €24 million, with the fee rising to as much as €28 million with incentives, thereby making López the club's most expensive signing. The following week, Lyon addressed an important need after reaching an agreement with Lille for the transfer of the Brazilian left winger Michel Bastos, with the transfer fee being approximately €18 million. Two days later, Lyon filled another need, signing another Porto player in left back Aly Cissokho for €15 million. An additional incentive involved in the deal is Porto will receive 20 percent of any future transfer fee Lyon receives for the player. On 29 July, Lyon, who admitted they needed at least one more striker, announced the signing of French international Bafétimbi Gomis from rivals Saint-Étienne, with the fee being approximately €13 million.

Before the summer signings, Lyon announced that two youth players would be promoted to the club's first team after agreeing to professional contracts. Defender Loïc Abenzoar and midfielder Maxime Gonalons both agreed to three-year professional contracts tying them to the club until 2012. Also, following the season, Lyon signed left back Timothée Kolodziejczak, who had been on a season long loan from Lens. Kolodziejczak agreed to a four-year contract and Lyon paid Lens €2.5 million. Lyon also completed the signing of 16-year-old Swiss goalkeeper Jérémy Frick, who signed a two-year deal. Frick, formerly of Servette, will join the club's youth academy.

Transfers

Summer in

|}

Winter In

|}

Total spending:  €82.5 million

Summer out

|}

Winter out

|}

Total income:  €50 million

Squad
Last updated 15 May 2010

Team kit
Umbro will manufacture the kits for Lyon. Umbro have been the official kit provider of Lyon since 2003 and, two years ago, signed an extension with Lyon until 2013. This season, Lyon will have brand-new home, away, Champions League kits, which were revealed to the public on 12 July, despite the shirts leaking on 17 June. The home shirt has a white base color, with the horizontal red and blue stripe in the middle, reverting from the club's red and blue vertical stripe that has been used in previous years. The logo of Umbro appears on the top-right of the shirt in blue. The away shirt features a black and red design. The top part of the shirt is black and it fades horizontally in the middle into red. The shirt has a partly red collar, and also has red details on the black sleeves. The European kit is midnight blue with the horizontal red and blue stripe locating in the middle of the shirt.

Club

Coaching staff

Other information

Pre-season
Lyon opened their pre-season in their usual setting training in the mountainous Rhône-Alpes commune of Tignes. Lyon confirmed several preseason friendly matches. Lyon also participated in the Peace Cup for the fourth time having won the exhibition tournament in 2007. On 11 July, Lyon opened up their pre-season facing fellow Ligue 1 club Nice in Albertville. Lyon won the match 1–0 with the lone goal of the match coming from Ederson in the 12th minute of play. 

A week later, Lyon hosted Lens in Arnas. Lyon trailed 0–2 heading into the 80th minute with both of Lens goals being scored as a result of Lyon mistakes. The first goal being scored due to an unexpected turnover by Sidney Govou and the second being scored as a result of casual, yet lazy play between defensemen Jean-Alain Boumsong and Timothée Kolodziejczak, with the former being more responsible. Lyon completed the comeback with both of their goals being scored by the Swede Kim Källström, the first being a free kick in the 85th minute and the second in the 89th minute to draw the match at 2–2, which was the final scoreline.

From 24 July to 2 August, Lyon will be among several top clubs that will participate in the 2009 Peace Cup held in Andalusia, Spain. Clubs playing in their group and whom they will face are defending Primeira Liga champions Porto and 2008–09 Süper Lig champions Beşiktaş, whom they played first. Lyon controlled the match for the majority of and eventually got a goal in the 69th minute from Kim Källström after a nice backheel assist from Miralem Pjanić. Leading 1–0 heading into the final minutes, Lyon's defense fell off, with Beşiktaş's first chance being cleared off the line by Pjanić leading to a corner. On the ensuing corner, the Turkish club equalised with the goal coming off the head of Mert Nobre in the 84th minute. That would be the eventual scoreline giving both clubs one point heading into their matches with Porto. In the match, Lyon suffered their first defeat of the season losing 0–2 with both of Porto's goals being scored by the Brazilian Hulk eliminating Lyon from the Peace Cup and also ending their preseason with 11 days to spare ahead of their opening league match against Le Mans.  

On 28 July, however, Lyon announced that on 30 July, they will play La Liga club Sevilla, who were also eliminated from the Peace Cup, in a friendly match at the Estadio Ramón Sánchez Pizjuán. They later announced, upon the club's return to France, they will face another La Liga side in Deportivo de La Coruña in Aix-les-Bains. In the Sevilla match, despite the debut of Lisandro López and boasting an almost full strength side, Lyon failed to get on the scoreboard losing 0–1 making the defeat their second straight loss in the preseason. Three days later, Lyon earned a positive result drawing 2–2 with Deportivo with both of their goals coming from new players Bafétimbi Gomis and López. Lyon ended the preseason with a record of one win, three draws and two defeats.

Friendly

Peace Cup

Competitions

Ligue 1

Olympique Lyonnais began their league campaign on the road taking on Le Mans at the Stade Léon-Bollée. Lyon started off the match very slow and eventually allowed a goal that was scored by Modibo Maïga in just the 21st minute. Lyon responded just seven minutes later with a goal from the converted defender Mathieu Bodmer, who equalized on a shot at the top of the box as a result of a great pass from Lisandro López. Following the break, Le Mans came out quickly in the attack and were awarded a questionable penalty by referee Lionel Jaffredo. The young Mathieu Coutadeur converted the penalty giving the home team a 2–1 lead. In the ensuing minutes, Lyon slowly lost focus, but were eventually revived when new signing Bafétimbi Gomis came on in the 77th minute. Their newfound attack still drew no goals and heading into the injury time session, Lyon were awarded a free kick just outside the penalty box. With new signings and free kick specialists Michel Bastos and López both standing over the ball, it was the latter who took it and placed the ball easily into the back of the net drawing the match at 2–2 and giving Lyon their first point of the season. Lyon's first at home was against Valenciennes. With a pivotal Champions League match coming up early next week and Jérémy Toulalan also going on international duty, he was partially rested for the match, which featured the midfield combination of Jean Makoun and Kim Källström. Lyon won the match 1–0 with a goal from Gomis, his first with the club, in the 37th minute. The goal was assisted on by Michel Bastos. The victory initially moved Lyon into fourth-place, but after the next day's matches, Lyon fell to eighth. The following week, Lyon faced Auxerre on the road. After their strong performance mid-week in the Champions League, manager Claude Puel implemented exactly the same formation, albeit with different players in certain positions. Despite missing several goal opportunities mid-week, César Delgado responded by dishing out two assists, the first on the club's opening goal scored by Jean-Alain Boumsong, who was making his season debut, and the club's second goal, scored by Miralem Pjanić, his first career league goal for the club. Lyon won the match 3–0. The Auxerre match was notable as it marked the debut of the highly rated 17-year-old Ishak Belfodil, who came on as a substitute in the 84th minute. The next week, Lyon returned home and were victors again claiming a 3–1 victory over Nancy, with all three Lyon goals coming from new signings Bastos, López and Gomis.

Following a long international break, Lyon faced Lorient at home, their first and only back-to-back home league match set. In the match, which was fairly even looking at the statistics, Lyon controlled possession for 57 percent of the match, but did not score a goal until the 72nd following a perfect cross from Sidney Govou into the box, which landed at the head of Michel Bastos and then into the back of the net. Lyon maintained the 1–0 lead to win the match moving the club into a tie for second place with title rivals Bordeaux. The following week, Lyon faced rivals Paris Saint-Germain at the Parc des Princes in a match that saw a Lyon side missing several key players. In the 29th minute, the Parisians got a well-deserved goal from former Lyon player Ludovic Giuly. Despite the home side maintaining their attack well into the second half, their first half goal was canceled out following an Aly Cissokho cross into the box that saw Bafétimbi Gomis get a slight touch on the ball to get it past Grégory Coupet. The goal secured a point for Lyon and also allowed the club to maintain their top 2 position in the table. Lyon contested up-and-comers Toulouse the following match day. Lyon defense was again the first to concede allowing a goal from youngster Moussa Sissoko in just the eighth minute. Despite conceding early, however, Lyon's attack was extremely uptempo, which allowed the away side to break into numerous counterattacks. Lyon's attack finally paid off, in the 52nd minute following a goal from Yannis Tafer, which was his first professional goal. Tafer, who came on as a half-time substitute, secured the goal following a cross into the box by the dangerous Cissokho. The French youth international ran near post and got a shot off high into the visiting net. With Lyon's confidence high, their attack increased, which led to numerous chances. Eventually, Lyon got a goal from Gomis, his second in two matches to give the club a 2–1 victory. The following week, Lyon reached top of the table for the first time this season, courtesy of a 2–0 win over Lens. Despite enduring a hostile crowd and constant pressure from Lens, Lyon and their defense stood tall with Govou and Kim Källström getting both goals in the seventh and 78th minute, respectively.

League table

Results summary

Results by round

Matches

Coupe de France

Lyon will enter the 2009–10 Coupe de France season having won the title just two seasons ago. Lyon will start from the Round of 64, as all Ligue 1 clubs will. On 14 December 2009, the draw for the Round of 64 was determined and Lyon were giving the task of traveling to Alsace to face second division club Strasbourg. Lyon's first match of the 2010 winter season was highly anticipated by the media and supporters alike following the team's disastrous ending to 2009 portion of the campaign. Lyon started this game in fantastic fashion scoring two goals in the first 15 minutes with Bafétimbi Gomis getting the opener in the 11th minute and Bastos getting one three minutes later. Layon maintained the 2–0 until injury time in the first half when Nicolas Fauvergue netted a goal for his side. Within the first 15 minutes of the second half, Lyon struggled to maintain its first half mentality. Young Strasbourg striker Magaye Gueye tested Lloris on two occasions. Eventually, the match was put to bed after 71 minutes following a laser free kick from Bastos giving Lyon a 3–1 lead, which was the final result. In the ensuing draw, Lyon were given another tough test, courtesy of fellow Ligue 1 club AS Monaco. In the Round of 32 clash, Lyon opened the scoring through Jean-Alain Boumsong on the cusp of half-time with a thumping header following a corner kick. After half-time, Monaco's Brazilian striker Nenê equalised from the penalty spot seven minutes into the second period after Sidney Govou was adjudged to have fouled him in the penalty area. Despite maintaining consistency throughout the match, Lyon would suffer defeat and elimination from the competition following the conversion of a close-range header by South Korean Park Chu-young, following a cross, 13 minutes from time. The goal was partially attributed to goalkeeper Hugo Lloris' unwillingness to intercept the ball upon realizing a teammate was attempting to clear it himself. The former's unwillingness and the teammate's attempt at a clearance was both futile as Park headed the ball in easily.

Matches

Coupe de la Ligue

Lyon will enter Coupe de la Ligue season having last won the cup in 2001. Last season, they were eliminated in the Round of 16 by Metz. Lyon entered the competition during the Round of 16 phase. The draw was determined on 25 September and Lyon were pitted against Metz for the second straight season. Metz defeated Lyon 1–3 with goals from Romain Rocchi, Sébastien Renouard and Victor Mendy in last year's competition. Lyon marched into the Round of 16 match initially nervous before taking control of the match with a rare goal from Jérémy Toulalan, his first as a Lyon player and only the second of his football career. Lyon later got great chances from Michel Bastos and Yannis Tafer with the latter actually scoring, however he was determined to bee offsides by the linesman. Though, Metz maintained the 1–0 deep into the second half, the match was sealed following a brace from Lisandro López, which took only two minutes to complete. In the ensuing draw, held the day after their victory, Lyon were paired with Lorient, whom they will contested on the road at the Stade du Moustoir mid-week on 26 January. In the match, Lorient took a firm stance early courtesy of a goal from Kevin Gameiro in the fourth minute after the Lorient striker took advantage of a blunder by new signing Dejan Lovren. Despite having 86 minutes to either draw the match or win it, Lyon failed to get on the score-sheet despite capable chances from López, Bastos and Pjanić on several occasions and thus were eliminated from the competition for the ninth straight season.

Matches

UEFA Champions League

Playoff round
Lyon entered the 2009–10 UEFA Champions League for the tenth-straight season. For the first time, however, they had to qualify in order to reach the group stage as they entered through the playoff round, due to their 3rd position finish last season. Clubs Lyon could have possibly encountered in the playoff round included Italian club Fiorentina, Spanish side Atlético Madrid and Scottish club Celtic. The draw was determined on 7 August and Lyon were given Belgian club Anderlecht as opponents. The first leg was played on 19 August at the Stade Gerland, while the second leg was played a week later at Constant Vanden Stock Stadium in Anderlecht. The winner entered the group stage of the UEFA Champions League.

In the opening leg, Lyon, at the onset, quickly forced a strong attacking pace into the game catching an unexpected Belgian side off guard. In just the 8th minute, Lyon were awarded a free kick and it was easily converted by Miralem Pjanić, his first ever goal with the club. The home side continued their attack forcing the Belgians to hold off their attack and focus more on defending. Despite Anderlecht's intent, in the 14th minute, Lyon were awarded a penalty by referee Wolfgang Stark after Lisandro López, on a breakaway, was taken down in the box by Anderlecht goalkeeper Silvio Proto. Having won the penalty, López stepped up to take it and converted giving Lyon a 2–0 lead in just 15 minutes of play. Throughout the first half, Lyon continued to control the match, at one point, having 65% of the possession. Their continued attack paid off with an amazing left-footed rocket shot from Michel Bastos in the 39th minute. Just three minutes later, Lyon converted again through Bafétimbi Gomis on an easy shot just in front of goal following a nice pass from López. The goal gave Lyon a 4–0 heading into the halftime. Lyon came out for the second half in completely opposite fashion compared to the first. This allowed Anderlecht to finally get some play on the ball. Just 14 minutes into the second half, Anderlecht got their first goal from the Argentine Matías Suárez, who beat both Mathieu Bodmer and Hugo Lloris to the ball and eventually pushed it into the back of the net. Just five minutes later, however, Lyon would regain their four-goal lead with Gomis scoring his second of the match following the Belgian goalkeeper Proto's mistake of leaving his net open by attempting to beat the Frenchman to a passing ball from Michel Bastos. Despite numerous chances from substitute César Delgado, Lyon could not add to their defining lead and headed to Brussels with a 5–1 aggregate lead.

In the second leg, Lyon decided to preserve their 5–1 aggregate lead by keeping the pace of the match slow, as well as holding possession as much as possible in order to keep Anderlecht, who were now playing at home, from getting an early goal. Eventually, this strategy paid off resulting in a goal from Lisandro following a rash mistake from an Anderlecht defender who, upon receiving the ball from the goalkeeper, made a pass directly into the path of the Argentine who rightfully intercepted it and easily chipped the ball over the unexpected goalkeeper to give Lyon a 1–0 lead and effectively end Anderlecht's chances. Six minutes later, Lisandro scored again, this time due to a great cross from Anthony Réveillère, who found the striker wide open inside the penalty box. Minutes before halftime, Lisandro scored his first career hat trick for the club in just his fourth match with them, converting the goal following a turnover from the Anderlecht midfielder Jan Polák. In the second half, Anderlecht converted from the penalty spot in the 51st minute and the 3–1 scoreline eventually remained until the end of the match. The victory allowed Lyon to advance to the group stages on an aggregate score of 8–2.

Group stage

The draw for the group stage of the Champions League was determined on 27 August 2009. Due to Arsenal's victory over Celtic in the third qualifying round, Lyon were inserted into Pot 2. Following the draw, Lyon were inserted into Group E with English club Liverpool from Pot 1, Italian side Fiorentina from Pot 3, and Hungarian club Debreceni VSC from Pot 4. Lyon have, previously, never faced Liverpool nor Debreceni in the Champions League, with the latter making their debut in the competition. However, Lyon have faced Fiorentina, whom they contested two matches against during last year's group stage. The first match, played at the Stade Gerland finished 2–2 in controversial fashion, while the second match away to Fiorentina was won by Lyon 2–1.

Lyon started their Champions League campaign with a 1–0 victory over Fiorentina. Fiorentina, who played most of the match with 10 men, due to a red card being given to Alberto Gilardino held on to a 0–0 draw until the 76th minute when the Bosnian midfielder Miralem Pjanić scored the opening goal and winning goal. The following match day, the club faced minnows Debrecen and came out with a 4–0. In the match, Lyon dominated the first half scoring three of their four goals in the first 25 minutes with Kim Källström, Pjanić, and Sidney Govou getting on the scoresheet. Bafétimbi Gomis capped the night scoring the final goal in the second half. 

On 20 October Lyon began their back-to-back matches against Liverpool with the first match being played at the historic Anfield. Despite Lyon attacking early on, it was Liverpool who got scored first with Yossi Benayoun converting. In the 33rd minute, Lyon's lone healthy centre back Cris suffered a concussion and was taken off the field before half-time, despite an attempt to continue playing. He was replaced by defensive midfielder Maxime Gonalons. Due to this, Lyon employed a more defensive style earlier in the second half, but eventually garnered enough confidence to get forward and in the 72nd minute, it paid off. Following a corner kick from Källström, Lyon got two chances at goal from Jérémy Toulalan and Jean Makoun before the ball was headed in by the substitute Gonalons. The goal drew the match at 1–1 and Lyon later won the match in injury time with the Argentine César Delgado scoring the game-winning goal. The victory was Lyon's first victory over an English club in the Champions League. In the return leg, Lyon managed a 1–1 draw, primarily due to the efforts of goalkeeper Hugo Lloris who performed admirably producing sharp stops from Fernando Torres, Dirk Kuyt, and Andriy Voronin in the first half, then displaying stunning reflexes to deny the Brazilian Lucas midway through the second period. Though Lyon conceded late following an amazing goal from Ryan Babel, they drew the match 1–1 with a goal from Lisandro López in injury time. The point brought Lyon's total tally to ten and assured the club a spot in the knockout stage.

Lyon's effort to go into the knockout stage in first place were put into danger following their 0–1 defeat to Fiorentina at the Stadio Artemio Franchi in Florence. Lyon contested the match missing several key players, notably starters Jérémy Toulalan and Anthony Réveillère. Despite outshooting and holding 57% of the possession, Lyon failed to get on the score-sheet and conceded from the penalty spot after referee Olegário Benquerença ruled that Aly Cissokho had committed a foul on Marco Marchionni inside of the box. The penalty was converted sublimely by Juan Manuel Vargas. The loss moved Fiorentina into the first place and ultimately the battle for top spot in the group was decided on the final day. Lyon faced Debrecen and like the first match, Lyon attacked early and by the end of the first half led 2–0 with goals from Bastos and Gomis. In the second half, Lyon increased their performance getting a free kick goal from Pjanić and also one from Cissokho, which was his first professional goal. During the final minutes of the match, Lyon's support was high and ecstatic, mainly due to the Liverpool–Fiorentina match being drawn at that point, their hearts were broken following a goal from Alberto Gilardino in injury time to give Fiorentina a 2–1 victory and top spot in the group. The 4–0 thrashing of Debrecen was deemed futile.

Matches 

Note 1: Debrecen played their home group matches at Ferenc Puskás Stadium in Budapest as their Stadion Oláh Gábor Út did not meet UEFA criteria.

First Knockout Round
For the seventh straight season, Lyon reached the first knockout round. Due to finishing second, Lyon faced the danger of being paired with several big clubs that finished first in other groups. Notable clubs Lyon could have been paired with include Barcelona, Manchester United, Chelsea, and Arsenal to name a few. Following the draw, held on 18 December 2009, Lyon indeed received a tough draw being given La Liga side Real Madrid. The draw meant that former Lyon player Karim Benzema returned to the Stade de Gerland after leaving the club only six months prior. This was the second straight season Lyon faced a Spanish club in the first knockout round having lost 3–6 on aggregate to Barcelona in last season's competition. The first leg was played at the Gerland on 16 February 2010, while the second leg was held at the Santiago Bernabéu Stadium on 10 March.

Quarter-finals
Following their successful 2–1 aggregate victory over Real Madrid, Lyon were inserted into the quarter-finals. The draw was conducted on 19 March and Lyon were drawn to face Ligue 1 rivals and fellow French club Bordeaux. On 30 March 2010, Lyon faced Bordeaux at the Stade de Gerland in the first leg of the competition. Lyon got on the scoreboard early through a goal through Lisandro López following a blunder from Bordeaux defender Michaël Ciani, which allowed Mathieu Bodmer to recover the ball inside the box and find López in front of goal. Undeterred, Bordeaux quickly leveled with a vital away goal from striker Marouane Chamakh after great service from Yoann Gourcuff. In the 32nd minute, Lyon again took the lead with Michel Bastos scoring following another Bordeaux error, this time from Benoît Trémoulinas who misplayed a Lyon cross, which allowed the ball to land at the feet of Bastos who proceeded to blast a shot past goalkeeper Cédric Carrasso. Midway through the second half, Laurent Blanc's team rallied with the Brazilian Wendel drilling a shot on goal, which went by Hugo Lloris, but went directly off the post. Minutes later, Lyon were awarded a penalty courtesy of a Matthieu Chalmé handball. The penalty was converted by Lisandro to give Lyon a 3–1 lead and the Argentine was later carded in the final minutes of the match, which resulted in him missing the second leg. The 3–1 scoreline remained ensuring Lyon a wonderful opportunity to reach their first ever UEFA Champions League semi-final.

In the second leg in Bordeaux, Claude Puel opted for a more defensive formation starting Maxime Gonalons ahead of the attack-minded Miralem Pjanić. The strategy was successful during the early stages but turned sour following an accurate shot from midfielder Alou Diarra, which again beat Lloris, but, for the second straight match, hit the post in the 43rd minute. Two minutes later, just before halftime, Bordeaux drew within one goal following a conversion from Chamakh. In the second half, Puel remained confident in defense opting to substitute out attacker and lone striker Bafétimbi Gomis in order to clog the midfield. In the final stages of the match, Bordeaux were near the game-winning goal following a header attempt by Wendel, but their hopes were spoiled following an amazing save from Lloris. Though Bordeaux were successful in attaining a victory, the 3–2 aggregate scoreline was in Lyon's favor allowing the club to advance to their first-ever UEFA Champions League semi-final.

Semi-finals
Lyon will be making their first-ever UEFA Champions League semi-final appearance following their 3–2 aggregate victory over French rivals Bordeaux. Following the quarter-final draw, the winner of the match were pitted to either face English club Manchester United or German club Bayern Munich. On 7 April 2010, Bayern Munich lost to Manchester United 3–2 at Old Trafford, but their 2–1 result in the previous leg in Munich allowed Bayern to advance to the semi-finals to face Lyon on the away goals rule.

Lyon and Bayern Munich have met recently. During the 2008–09 UEFA Champions League, the two clubs were inserted into the same group for the group stage phase of the competition. In the first match, played at the Allianz Arena, the clubs drew 1–1 with Martín Demichelis converting an own goal for Lyon and Zé Roberto equalising for Bayern early in the second half. In the second match in Lyon, Bayern defeated Lyon 3–2 with Frenchman Franck Ribéry being particularly instrumental in the victory assisting on two goals and also scoring one.

Start formations

Starting 11
Lineup that started in the club's league match  against Le Mans on 15 May.

Squad stats

Appearances and goals
Last updated on 15 May 2010.

|-
|colspan="14"|Players sold after the start of the season:

|}

Other statistics
Last updated 15 May 2010 

Note: For all official competitions
{| class="sortable" border="2" cellpadding="4" cellspacing="0" style="text-align:left; margin: 1em 1em 1em 0; background: #f9f9f9; border: 1px #aaa solid; border-collapse: collapse; font-size: 95%;"
|-
!class="sortable" width="50px"|No.
!width="50px"|Pos.
!class="sortable" width="130px"|Nationality
!width="130px"|Player
!width="70px" style="background: #FFFFFF"| Assists
!width="70px" style="background: #FFFFFF"| Minutes Played
!width="50px" style="background: #FFEE99"| 
!width="50px" style="background: #FFEE99"|   
!width="50px" style="background: #FF8888"| 
|-
|1 || GK ||  France ||  || 1 || 4590 || 0 || 0 || 0
|----
|2 || DF ||  France ||  || 0 || 557 || 2 || 0 || 0
|----
|3 || DF ||  Brazil ||  || 1 || 3972 || 11 || 1 || 0
|----
|4 || DF ||  France ||  || 0 || 2322 || 1 || 0 || 0
|----
|5 || MF ||  France ||  || 2 || 1032 || 3 || 0 || 0
|----
|6 || MF ||  Sweden ||  || 6 || 3152 || 5 || 0 || 0
|----
|7 || MF ||  Brazil ||  || 5 || 2703 || 3 || 0 || 0
|----
|8 || MF ||  Bosnia and Herzegovina ||  || 9 || 3173 || 5 || 0 || 0
|----
|9 || FW ||  Argentina ||  || 5 || 3236 || 5 || 0 || 0
|----
|10 || MF ||  Brazil ||  || 5 || 1665 || 1 || 0 || 0
|----
|12 || DF ||  France ||  || 0 || 101 || 0 || 0 || 0
|----
|13 || DF ||  France ||  || 1 || 3724 || 6 || 0 || 1
|----
|14 || FW ||  France ||  || 4 || 2416 || 8 || 0 || 0
|----
|17 || DF ||  Cameroon ||  || 2 || 3010 || 5 || 1 || 0
|----
|18 || FW ||  France ||  || 4 || 2665 || 2 || 0 || 0
|----
|19 || MF ||  Argentina ||  || 3 || 2004 || 4 || 0 || 0
|----
|20 || DF ||  France ||  || 1 || 3768 || 7 || 0 || 0
|-----
|22 || MF ||  France ||  || 0 || 18 || 0 || 0 || 0
|----
|23|| DF ||  Brazil ||  || 0 || 0 || 0 || 0 || 0
|----
|25 || GK ||  France ||  || 0 || 0 || 0 || 0 || 0
|----
|26 || DF ||  Croatia ||  || 1 || 770 || 1 || 0 || 0
|----
|28 || MF ||  France ||  || 2 || 3150 || 9 || 1 || 0
|----
|29 || FW ||  France ||  || 0 || 330 || 1 || 0 || 0
|----
|30 || GK ||  France ||  || 0 || 270 || 0 || 0 || 0
|----
|31 || MF ||  France ||  || 0 || 0 || 0 || 0 || 0
|----
|32 || DF ||  France ||  || 0 || 643 || 0 || 0 || 0
|----
|34 || MF ||  France ||  || 0 || 0 || 0 || 0 || 0
|----
|35|| DF ||  France ||  || 0 || 0 || 0 || 0 || 0
|----
|36 || DF ||  France ||  || 0 || 0 || 0 || 0 || 0
|----
|37 || DF ||  France ||  || 0 || 0 || 0 || 0 || 0
|----
|38|| FW ||  France ||  || 0 || 12 || 0 || 0 || 0
|----
|39 || FW ||  France ||  || 0 || 55 || 0 || 0 || 0
|----
|40 || GK ||  France ||  || 0 || 0 || 0 || 0 || 0
|----
|41|| MF ||  France ||  || 0 || 1690 || 7 || 1 || 0
|----
|44 || DF ||  Senegal ||  || 0 || 0 || 0 || 0 || 0
|----
|46|| DF ||  France ||  || 0 || 0 || 0 || 0 || 0
|----

.

References

External links
Olympique Lyonnais Official Website

Lyon
2009-10